Orthothrips is a genus of thrips in the family Phlaeothripidae.

Species
 Orthothrips angustus
 Orthothrips bilineatus
 Orthothrips boneti
 Orthothrips caudatus
 Orthothrips dubius
 Orthothrips exilis
 Orthothrips leptura
 Orthothrips stylifer
 Orthothrips tepoztlanensis
 Orthothrips woytkowski

References

Phlaeothripidae
Thrips
Thrips genera